Homalocalyx echinulatus is a member of the family Myrtaceae endemic to Western Australia.

It blooms between June and September producing pink flowers.

It is found on sandstone hills and breakaway in the eastern Mid West and the central Goldfields-Esperance region of Western Australia centred around Wiluna where it grows in sandy soils.

References

echinulatus
Endemic flora of Western Australia
Myrtales of Australia
Rosids of Western Australia
Vulnerable flora of Australia
Plants described in 1987